North-eastern blind snake may refer to:

 Anilios torresianus
 Sundatyphlops polygrammicus